{{Infobox podcast
| title = If I Were You
| image = 
| caption = If I Were Yous cover art
| hosting = Jake HurwitzAmir Blumenfeld
| genre = ComedyAdvice
| updates = Weekly (Monday) with occasional bonus episode (Thursday)
| length = 30–65 minutes
| language = English
| began = May 13, 2013
| ended = 
| provider = iTunesSoundCloud (2013–2014, 2015–2017)PodcastOne (2014–2015)Spreaker (2015–2017)HeadGum (2015–present)Art19 (2017–present)Spotify (2017–present)
| url = 
}}If I Were You''' is a comedy advice podcast created and hosted by American comedy duo Jake and Amir, known for their involvement with CollegeHumor and their web series also called Jake and Amir. First released on May 13, 2013, new episodes are posted every Monday (as well as occasional bonus Thursday episodes), featuring the duo's comedic advice for listeners who have submitted questions by email.

The show has appeared on the iTunes podcast charts in multiple countries, reaching number 3 in the United States.

Content
Each episode of If I Were You usually begins and ends with a different theme tune created by a listener. The format of the show consists of hosts Jake Hurwitz and Amir Blumenfeld reading out questions—or, some episodes, playing audio questions—emailed to them by listeners with problems; usually three or four questions every episode. They assign the listener a pseudonym (often humorous or that of a popular fictional character) and discuss the problem, often brainstorming ideas and improvising humorous situations, before reaching and summarizing a conclusion of what the person should do.

The show has featured several guest stars, including CollegeHumor co-founder Ricky Van Veen, actors and comedians Ben Schwartz and Thomas Middleditch, actresses Allison Williams and Rose McIver, co-workers Streeter Seidell, Emily Axford, Sarah Schneider, Brian K. Murphy, Patrick Cassels, and Dan Gurewitch, The Pete Holmes Show host Pete Holmes, rappers Hoodie Allen and Lil Dicky, singer Alana Haim, Jake's mom Laura Hurwitz, and his brother Micah Hurwitz, all of whom were present for entire episodes, as well as cancer sufferer Ethan Trex and Amir's  (at the time) girlfriend Laura, who were only in parts of an episode.

Reception

The podcast reached number 1 on the British, Canadian and Australian iTunes charts, as well as peaking at #3 in the United States and #17 in Germany.The Guardians Miranda Sawyer called If I Were You "a typical example of a comedy podcast" and "amiable enough", but said it contained "far too much laughing", commenting that "If I wanted stream-of-consciousness waffle with the occasional funny line, I'd listen to [my small children]."

Sam Tabachnik of The Washington Post has written of the podcast that Jake and Amir "have their fingers firmly on the pulse of the digital comedy scene," and "riff off each other with ease," while The Concordians Kayla Culver described it as "comfortable to listen to" and "genuinely funny," "like listening to two best friends having a hilarious conversation on the couch next to you."

Episodes
Episodes were originally posted every Monday to SoundCloud and Tumblr, and then were posted on podcast website PodcastOne''. As announced on Episode 146, IIWY show left PodcastOne and is now available on radio and podcast website, Spreaker. They are also available on iTunes. The second episode was posted early, on the Friday after the first episode. There are 580 episodes (as of February 20, 2023).

References

External links
 

Audio podcasts
CollegeHumor
Comedy and humor podcasts
Advice podcasts
2013 podcast debuts
Headgum